Anwar Mohammed Gargash (born 28 March 1959, in Dubai) is an Emirati politician who served as the minister of state for foreign affairs between February 2008 and February 2021. Since February 2021, he serves as a senior diplomatic advisor to the United Arab Emirates President.

Education
Gargash received a bachelor's degree in 1981 and a master's degree in 1984 in political science from George Washington University. He then obtained a PhD from King's College of Cambridge University in 1990.

Career

Gargash started his career as a faculty member at United Arab Emirates University where he served from 1985 to 1995.

From 1995 to 1999, he worked as managing editor at the strategic studies publications of the Emirates Center for Strategic Studies and Research (ECSSR) and from 1995 to 2006 as chief executive officer of Gargash Enterprise. Between August 2006 and February 2007 Gargash was the chairman of the National Election Committee.

He was appointed minister of state for the federal national council in 2006. In February 2008, Gargash was appointed as minister of state for foreign affairs, and remained in that office until February 2021.

On 13 August 2020 Gargash announced the UAE's agreement to normalize relations with Israel stating that his country wanted to deal with the threats facing the two-state solution, specifically annexation of the Palestinian territories, and urging the Palestinians and Israelis to return to the negotiating table. Gargash's tenure ended on 10 February 2021 when Shakhbout bin Nahyan was appointed to the post. Immediately following his removal from the office he was made a diplomatic advisor to UAE President Sheikh Khalifa bin Zayed Al Nahyan. In February 2022, Gargash said that the UAE would not "take sides" after Russia invaded Ukraine.

Gargash has been involved with the boards of various UAE institutions, such as the UAE's Culture and Science Symposium, Al Ittihad, Dubai Chamber of Commerce and Industry (DCCI), Emirates Media, Dubai School of Government, Al Owais Cultural Foundation, Dubai Economic Council, and the Ministerial Legislative Committee.

Personal life
Gargash is a member of the prominent trading families in Dubai which is part of the minority Huwala in the United Arab Emirates.

In 2017 Gargash received the distinguished alumni achievement award from George Washington University, and the Abu Dhabi awards in 2017.

References

External links

1959 births
Alumni of King's College, Cambridge
Columbian College of Arts and Sciences alumni
Emirati businesspeople
Emirati people of Iranian descent
Emirati Sunni Muslims
Foreign ministers of the United Arab Emirates
Government ministers of the United Arab Emirates
Living people
People from Dubai
Academic staff of United Arab Emirates University